Kenneth “Ken” Collins is a Kansas politician, and currently serves in the Kansas House of Representatives.

Collins has been serving in the Kansas House of Representatives since 2019. He attended Fort Scott Community College where he earned an Associates of Science and attended Friends University from 1999 to 2001 where he earned a Bachelors of Science in Computer Information Systems.

References

Living people
Republican Party members of the Kansas House of Representatives
21st-century American politicians
Friends University alumni
Fort Scott Community College alumni
1963 births